The following highways are/were numbered 941:

Ireland
  R941 regional road

United States